Tursk may refer to:

Tursk, Masovian Voivodeship
Tursk, Lubusz Voivodeship
Occasional confusion with Tursko, as in, e.g., "Battle of Tursk"